Buick is a car brand of General Motors.

Buick may also refer to:
Buick (name), or Buik, a Scottish surname
Buick (album), an album by Sawyer Brown
Buick, British Columbia, a community in Canada
Buick, Missouri, a ghost town in the United States

See also
List of Buick vehicles, a list of all models produced by Buick Motor Division